Nuclear inhibitor of protein phosphatase 1 is an enzyme that in humans is encoded by the PPP1R8 gene.

This gene, through alternative splicing, encodes three different isoforms. Two of the protein isoforms encoded by this gene are specific inhibitors of type 1 serine/threonine protein phosphatases and can bind but not cleave RNA. The third protein isoform lacks the phosphatase inhibitory function but is a single-strand endoribonuclease comparable to RNase E of E. coli. This isoform requires magnesium for its function and cleaves specific sites in A+U-rich regions of RNA.

Interactions
PPP1R8 has been shown to interact with PPP1CA, Histone deacetylase 2, SF3B1 EED and the EZH2 domain of PRC2.

References

Further reading